Nikolay Goncharov  (born 13 January 1984, Verkhnemakeevka, Kasharsky District) is a Russian political figure and a deputy of the 8th State Duma. 

From 2006 to 2010, he worked as an assistant prosecutor and a lawyer. In 2010 he was appointed the CEO of "Donskoy Khleb". In 2014 he was elected deputy of the Assembly of deputies of the Kasharsky District of the 5th convocation. In September 2021, he was elected to the 8th State Duma from the Belokalitvinsky District constituency.

References

1984 births
Living people
United Russia politicians
21st-century Russian politicians
Eighth convocation members of the State Duma (Russian Federation)